Lisa Maree Keightley (born 26 August 1971) is an Australian former cricketer and current cricket coach. She played primarily as a right-handed batter. She appeared in nine Test matches, 82 One Day Internationals and one Twenty20 International for Australia between 1995 and 2005. She played domestic cricket for New South Wales, as well as Warwickshire and Wiltshire.

Following her playing career, she became a coach, leading Australia, Perth Scorchers and England, amongst others.

Career 

Keightley played nine Tests and 85 One Day Internationals for the Australia women's national cricket team between 1995 and 2005 and represented New South Wales in the Women's National Cricket League from 1996/97 to 2004/05.

She holds the record for the highest ever maiden ton in Women's ODI history (156*)

She played 91 matches in the domestic national cricket league, scoring 3081 runs at 37.12 with 3 centuries, 21 fifties and a highest score of 144*.  She also took 10 wickets at 27.6.

On 30 October 2019, Keightley was appointed head coach of the English women's team, the first woman to hold the post full-time. She had previously coached New South Wales, Australia women, Western Australia and Perth Scorchers, as well as leading the England Women's Academy. Keightley left the position at the end of England's 2022 home summer.

One Day International centuries 
Keightley scored four centuries in One Day International matches.

References

External links
 
 Lisa Keightley at southernstars.org.au

1971 births
Living people
People from Mudgee
Australia women Test cricketers
Australia women One Day International cricketers
Australia women Twenty20 International cricketers
New South Wales Breakers cricketers
Warwickshire women cricketers
Wiltshire women cricketers
Australian cricket coaches
Female cricket coaches
Wicket-keepers